Thomas Lowes Atkin (19 August 1906 − 1986) was an English footballer who played as a right winger for several clubs.

Playing career
Born in Darlington, Tommy Atkin started out with his home town club Darlington in 1925 who were in the Second Division, having their highest ever League finish that season. After the 1926−27 season when Darlington were relegated, he was transferred to First Division club Bolton Wanderers.

The following season, in 1928, he went to Doncaster Rovers in Division Three (North), the division in which he'd play for the next eight seasons. He was at Doncaster for four years, where he played 105 league and cup games. Following this, Atkin moved back to the North East playing for Gateshead for two seasons, and then in 1934 returning to play for Darlington for a further two seasons.

He played for Wigan Athletic during the 1936–37 season, playing 41 games and scoring nine goals in the Cheshire League. He moved to Peterborough for their 1937−38 season in the Midland League, scoring 10 times in 42 league and cup appearances.

Atkin married in 1936, and died in 1986 in his native Darlington.

References

1906 births
1986 deaths
Footballers from Darlington
English footballers
Association football wingers
Doncaster Rovers F.C. players
Darlington F.C. players
Bolton Wanderers F.C. players
Gateshead A.F.C. players
Wigan Athletic F.C. players
Peterborough United F.C. players
English Football League players